Bisk Farm is a brand which is owned by SAJ Food Products (P) Ltd, a part of the Aparna Group of Companies. It is a fast-moving consumer goods company, headquartered in the city of Kolkata in the Indian state of Bengal.

Since it was formed in the year 2000,  Bisk Farm products have been available throughout Eastern and North Eastern India, and parts of South, Central and North India. The company eventually aims to market its products across the country.

The company produces a more than of 150 products from biscuits, cookies, cakes, rusks, extruded snacks, filled wafers and controls 15% of market share in East India, Britannia, Anmol and Parle Agro being some of the major competitors in the region. Some popular brands are The Top, Googly, Marie, Spicy, Just Ginger, Bourbon, Royal cream, Cheese Cream . It also sells freshly made snacks, breads and sandwiches through its brand-owned "Just Baked" stores, along with desserts like Celebration Cakes, pastries and muffins.

History

Krishnadas Paul was born in Kamarkita village in Burdwan, West Bengal, and studied law before joining the family business of trading and distribution set up by his father in 1947. Paul set up Aparna Agency in 1974 and took up distribution for Nestle, Dabur and Reckitt & Colman, after the business was split among five brothers. Bisk Farm was set up by Krishnadas Paul in year 2000 at the age of 60 and even his ripe age did not prevent the man from creating one of the most successful businesses out of West Bengal in the 21st century. The company grew into a prestigious brand. After passing away of Krishnadas Paul in year 2020, it is now being spearheaded by his son Arpan and the company closed the year ending March 31, 2020 with a turnover of Rs 1,500 crore. The group's turnover topped a whopping Rs 2,300 crore, including the volume of the trading arm as the firm started with distribution business and continuing it. Till year 2020, the organisation has five plants and the second largest market share in biscuits after Britannia in the Eastern part of India. Currently, the organisation has a presence in 19 Indian states. In October 2020, organisation planned to set up a manufacturing unit in Assam with an investment of Rs 100 crore benefitting over 1,000 people  to get direct employment in the project.

In the year 2004,even after four years into the launch of biscuit brand Bisk Farm, sales were yet to pick and Loss in the business had crossed Rs 15 crore and was still growing, when K D Paul and his son-in-law Vijay Kumar Singh decided to make one final effort before deciding on winding up of business. Company reoriented its strategy as a need of the hour and instead of trying endlessly for a pan-India presence, the company decided to think regional and appeal to people in Eastern India. A change in policy in product formulation and revamping product packaging methods followed with new regional commercials of its 6 to 7 products and organisation hit the television promotion in January 2005. The strategy proved successful and marked a milestone for Bisk Farm and Aparna Group, which manages the brand. Before the launch of Bisk Farm, the group was one of Kolkata's leading distributors and clearing and forwarding agents of fast-moving consumer goods products and this brand marked the group's entry into manufacturing. In four years, the company made Rs 200 crore-plus turnover through 55 products and crossed the bad phase. With a 40% share of the branded biscuit market, he claims that the brand is the second largest in the Eastern region, and is hot on the heels of market leader Britannia. Subsequently, the company riding on these successes followed further by a diversification into the bakery business, where the company made a retail entry in December 2008 with their Bisk Farm — Just Baked outlets. By 2009, Bisk Farm had a presence in the north-eastern states West Bengal, Jharkhand, Bihar, Orissa, and neighbouring country Bhutan. The company also made its entry into Chhattisgarh and even being a regional entity is able to compete with companies like Britannia, Parle and ITC which are in similar industry from many years.

The company is all set to fulfill its vision of becoming a complete food company by introducing a wide variety of food products From biscuits to bakery — cakes, cookies and Rusks and moving on to extruded snacks. The company also launched India's first sugar-free cream cracker and one more offering Googly, a sweet and sour cracker biscuit. Till November 2009, there were eight Just Baked outlets operational and the company planned to target around 25 by March 2010 and by March 2011 company planned to increase to 100 outlets across Kolkata and its suburbs. In January 2010,Bisk Farm had started Rs 50-crore production facility in Siliguri which is contributing about 4,000 tonnes production capacity to the combined existing capacities at Uluberia and Sankrail, which are also running to near-full potential. For expanding its operations in South-India the company had planned major production facility, an ambitious Rs 100-crore and 8,000 tonne venture at Bangalore, Karnataka, and is awaiting Karnatka Government approval. The government approval has been confirmed and the ceremonial opening of the factory has been done by Ms.K Ratna Prabha former chief secretary on 9 March 2022  It is also planning operations in Tamil Nadu, Andhra Pradesh Madhya Pradesh and Uttar Pradesh. To finance its operations in these states and country wide in India, it rolled out an IPO(Initial Public Offer) in year 2011 to raise Rs 1000-1200 crores.

References

External links
 

Confectionery companies of India
Manufacturing companies based in Kolkata
Indian chocolate companies
Retail companies established in 2000
Dairy products companies of India
Indian brands
2000 establishments in West Bengal
Indian companies established in 2000